Schmalensee is a municipality in the district of Segeberg, in Schleswig-Holstein, Germany. It is located on the shores of the eponymous lake.

References

Municipalities in Schleswig-Holstein
Segeberg